Viktor Rumpelmayer (7 November 1830 – 14 June 1885, in Vienna) was a 19th-century Austro-Hungarian architect, whose style was a combination of French and Italian influences and the Viennese trends characteristic for the period. He is regarded as one of the most eminent Central European architects of his time.

Born in Preßburg, Hungary (Pozsony, today Bratislava, Slovakia), Rumpelmayer worked not only in his home country, but also in Bulgaria, where he designed and constructed the Neo-Baroque royal palace of Bulgaria (today the National Art Gallery) and Knyaz Alexander Battenberg's summer palace Euxinograd, on the Black Sea coast. Among his other works are a number of palaces for well-known members of the nobility, the British embassy in Vienna with Christ Church, the German embassy in Vienna the Portuguese pavilion at the Paris Exposition Universelle (1900), among other prominent commissions Rumpelmayer also redesigned the Festetics Palace in Keszthely,  Hungary.

References 

Architects from Bratislava
Hungarian architects
Architecture in Bulgaria
1830 births
1885 deaths
19th-century architects